The Cepu Forest Railway (officially branded as Loco Tour Cepu) is a  narrow gauge light logging railway that runs through teak plantations to the northwest of the town of Cepu, in Cepu district, on the boundary between Central and East Java provinces, on the island of Java in Indonesia. It is owned by Perhutani, a state-owned forestry company of Indonesia. Steam traction is still dominant.

Along with Olean Sugar Mill in Situbondo, East Java (a candidate World Heritage Site), Tasik Madu sugar mill and the rack railway at Ambarawa (both also in Central Java), the Cepu Forest Railway is one of the four main centres of steam railway heritage remaining in Java. It is therefore of major heritage importance and due to its globally significant status as an active and complete steam locomotive-powered logging railway it might also be considered a candidate World Heritage Site.

Since 1998 much of the track has been lifted, but occasional logging trains continued to operate until 2002.

Since 2002 only chartered logging trains and a tourist train have been run (Loko Tour). The railway is popular with foreign tourists, especially from Europe, the United States and Japan.

In 2006 a bridge just outside Cepu was damaged by flooding. In late 2007 this was repaired, and tourist trains were restored to the arboretum in December 2007. Since then there have been numerous tours and chartered logging trains. There were also reportedly 'real' logging trains run early in 2010 when otherwise inaccessible trees brought down by storm damage were removed using steam trains.

Tours and charter trains are marketed and run by PT Palawi, a subsidiary of Perhutani, in Jakarta.

References

Further reading 

Forest railways
3 ft 6 in gauge railways in Indonesia
Central Java
Railway lines in Indonesia